Puya brittoniana is a species in the genus Puya. It is a spiny plant, from the same family as the pineapple. This species is endemic to Bolivia.

References

brittoniana
Flora of Bolivia
Taxa named by John Gilbert Baker